The Handmaiden is a 2016 South Korean psychological thriller film directed by Park Chan-wook and starring Kim Min-hee, Kim Tae-ri, Ha Jung-woo and Cho Jin-woong. It is inspired by the 2002 novel Fingersmith by Welsh writer Sarah Waters, with the setting changed from Victorian era Britain to Korea under Japanese colonial rule.

The film was selected to compete for the Palme d'Or at the 2016 Cannes Film Festival. It was released in South Korea on 1 June 2016. The film received critical acclaim, with praise for its performances, direction, score, cinematography, visuals, and writing. It grossed over $38 million worldwide. At the 71st British Academy Film Awards, the film won the category of Best Film Not in the English Language.

Plot

Part 1
In Japanese-occupied Korea, a con man operating under the sobriquet of "Count Fujiwara" plans to seduce a Japanese heiress named Lady Hideko, then marry her and commit her to an asylum in order to steal her inheritance. He hires a pickpocket named Sook-hee to become Hideko's maid and encourage Hideko to marry him.

Hideko lives with her Uncle Kouzuki, a Korean man who helped the Japanese take over his country in exchange for a gold mine. Kouzuki then uses this wealth to feed his obsession with rare books, selling forgeries to further accumulate money and books. Sook-hee's main job is to help Hideko prepare to read for Kouzuki's guests. Returning frustrated from a reading, Hideko demands Sook-hee sleep next to her. The two end up making love, under the pretext of preparing Hideko for her married life with the Count. Sook-hee begins expressing reluctance about the plan, but when Hideko herself suggests she loves someone other than the Count, Sook-hee insists on the marriage. Hideko slaps her and violently throws her out of the room.

When Kouzuki leaves on business for a week, Hideko and Fujiwara elope. After cashing out Hideko's inheritance, it is revealed that Hideko's naïveté was part of the con. She and Fujiwara double-crossed Sook-hee and convinced the asylum that she is the "Countess" to have her committed in Hideko's stead.

Part 2
A series of flashbacks show that Hideko's “reading practice” was in fact Kouzuki teaching her to erotically read sadistic pornography since she was five years old. The flashbacks show a regimen of psychological and physical abuse that gradually degrades the sanity of Hideko's aunt, who is eventually found hanged from a tree in the yard, and so Hideko takes over as the reader for the auctions. When Hideko questions the description of a hanging in a book she has to read, Kouzuki tells her that he murdered her aunt using torture devices in the basement after she attempted to run away.

In the more recent past, the Count realizes seducing Hideko would be impossible and instead includes her in the plan to elope and then split her inheritance. When Hideko expresses her fear of her uncle, the Count bribes her a vial of opium with which to commit suicide so that she can never be taken to the basement alive, calling it a "wedding present". Hideko demands the Count find her a girl to hire as a maid, to commit to an asylum in Hideko's place.

While being instructed by the Count, who takes advantage of Sook-hee's illiteracy, Hideko unexpectedly falls in love with her. Hideko tries to confess her love, but when Sook-hee insists the marriage go forward, Hideko throws her out of the bedroom and then tries to hang herself. Sook-hee saves her, and both admit to their plots. Hideko helps Sook-hee write a letter to her family to say she has teamed up with Hideko, asking for their help on carrying out a plot to get Hideko and Sook-hee away from the men who have been manipulating them. Hideko shows Sook-hee the books she was forced to read and Sook-hee begins destroying the library. Hideko calls Sook-hee "her savior" and joins in destroying her uncle's collection.

Part 3
After leaving Sook-hee at the asylum, Fujiwara and Hideko eat together at a high-class hotel, where he tells her of his past and asks her to marry him again, this time as Sook-hee, as they have switched identities. He also reveals that Sook-hee will be dead within a few days, causing Hideko to question Fujiwara's desires. Sook-hee's friend Bok-soon sets a fire at the asylum and poses as a firefighter to rescue her. Hideko doses Fujiwara's wine with drops from the opium vial, causing him to pass out and allowing her to leave with her money. The women reunite and flee together, disguising Hideko as a man to avoid detection.

Kouzuki captures Fujiwara after receiving a letter from Hideko detailing Fujiwara's deception. He tortures Fujiwara in his cellar with his collection of antique bookmaking tools and presses him for sexual details about his niece. Fujiwara makes up a story about making love on their wedding night, while a flashback shows that he watched Hideko masturbate before cutting her own hand with a knife to stain her sheets with blood, refusing to consummate the marriage. When Kouzuki presses for more details, Fujiwara convinces him to give him one of his cigarettes, after which he disgustedly refuses to give further details. Kouzuki notices the cigarettes are producing blue smoke, and Fujiwara reveals that his cigarettes were laced with mercury, and the toxic gas in the smoke kills them both.

On a ferry to Shanghai, China, Sook-hee and Hideko celebrate their newfound freedom by making love once again.

Cast

Production
In December 2014, it was reported that Kim Min-hee, Kim Tae-ri, Ha Jung-woo and Cho Jin-woong signed on for the film. Kim Tae-ri was selected from 1,500 candidates to play the role. Shooting for the film began in June 2015 and concluded in October 2015.

The books The Dream of the Fisherman's Wife and Jin Ping Mei were featured in the film.

Locations 
The film was shot in both Japan and Korea. Kouzuki's mansion with combined elements of Japanese and British architecture was filmed in Kuwana in Mie prefecture in Japan, using the exterior of the Moroto Seiroku Mansion and CGI to augment exterior details. Known as Rokkaen, it was designed by British architect Josiah Conder and built in 1913. The interior of the library and the staircase leading to Hideko's bedroom were built as interior sets. The cherry tree from which Hideko's aunt is found hanged was in the gardens of the hospital on Sorok Island in Jeolla, South Korea.

Release 
In February 2016, CJ Entertainment announced that The Handmaiden was pre-sold to 116 countries, including to Amazon Studios for the US. The film premiered in competition at the 2016 Cannes Film Festival, where it received a standing ovation, and Ryu Seong-hee won the Vulcan Award of the Technical Artist for her art direction work on the film. The film was also screened in the Special Presentations section of the 2016 Toronto International Film Festival, where The Playlist named it as one of the 15 best films of the festival. In South Korea, the film was released on 1 June 2016 and sold more than 4 million tickets.

In the United States, the distribution of the film was handled by Amazon Studios and Magnolia Pictures. The film opened in limited release across five cinemas in New York City and Los Angeles, and played in 140 additional cinemas in the following weeks. Eventually, the film grossed more than $2 million in the United States theatrically; the film outgrossed Stoker and became the highest-grossing Park Chan-wook-directed film in the United States.  It was released on DVD in the US on 24 January 2017 and Blu-ray on March 28, 2017.

In the United Kingdom, the distribution of the film was handled by Amazon Studios and Curzon Artificial Eye. The film grossed more than $1.8 million in the United Kingdom theatrically, and became the highest-grossing foreign-language film in the UK in 2017.

The original theatrical cut of the film runs 144 minutes. An extended cut, running 168 minutes, was later given a limited theatrical release in the UK and has also been released on home video in some international markets.

Home media 
In the United Kingdom, it was 2017's fifth best-selling foreign language film on home video, and the year's third best-selling Korean film (behind Operation Chromite and Train to Busan).

Reception

Critical response
The Handmaiden has received widespread critical acclaim. On Rotten Tomatoes, the film has an approval rating of 96%, based on 225 reviews, and an average score of 8.3/10. The site's critical consensus reads, "The Handmaiden uses a Victorian crime novel as the loose inspiration for another visually sumptuous and absorbingly idiosyncratic outing from director Park Chan-wook." On Metacritic, the film holds a weighted average score of 84 out of 100, based on 40 reviews, indicating "universal acclaim". The Economist described the film as a masterpiece. Benjamin Lee of The Guardian ranked it four out of five stars and described it as "a hugely entertaining thriller".

The film's numerous sexually explicit scenes between the two main female characters were criticized by Laura Miller at Slate, who described the scenes as "disappointingly boilerplate" and featuring "visual clichés of pornographic lesbianism, [the actresses'] bodies offered up for the camera’s delectation." However, The New Yorkers Jia Tolentino said that "the women know what they look like, it seems—they are consciously performing for each other—and Park is deft at extracting the particular sense of silly freedom that can be found in enacting a sexual cliché."

Top ten lists
The Handmaiden was listed on numerous critics' top ten lists.

 1st – Danny Bowes, RogerEbert.com
 2nd – Dan Callahan, RogerEbert.com
 2nd – Noel Murray & Katie Rife, The A.V. Club
 2nd – Rob Hunter, Film School Rejects
 2nd – Sean Mulvihill, RogerEbert.com
 2nd – Tasha Robinson, The Verge
 2nd – William Bibbiani, CraveOnline
 3rd – Amy Nicholson, MTV
 3rd – Witney Seibold, CraveOnline
 3rd – Jen Yamato, The Daily Beast
 3rd – James Berardinelli, Reelviews
 3rd – Bilge Ebiri, L.A. Weekly
 4th – Kimberley Jones, The Austin Chronicle
 4th – Scott Tobias, Village Voice
 5th – Lean Pickett, Chicago Reader
 5th – Kate Taylor, The Globe and Mail
 5th – Josh Kupecki, The Austin Chronicle
 5th – Haleigh Foutch, Collider
 5th – Erin Whitney, ScreenCrush
 5th – Peter Freeman, DC Outlook
 6th – Sean Axmaker, Parallax View
 6th – John Powers, Vogue
 6th – Alonso Duralde, TheWrap
 6th – Christy Lemire and Peter Sobczynski, RogerEbert.com
 6th – Mike D’Angelo & A.A. Dowd, The A.V. Club
 7th – Bill Goodykoontz, The Arizona Republic
 7th – Matt Zoller Seitz & Brian Tallerico, RogerEbert.com
 7th – Christopher Orr, The Atlantic
 7th – Steve Davis, The Austin Chronicle
 8th – Matt Singer, ScreenCrush
 8th – Ty Burr, The Boston Globe
 8th – Todd McCarthy, The Hollywood Reporter
 8th – Manohla Dargis, The New York Times
 8th – David Edelstein, New York Magazine
 9th – The Guardian
 10th – Marc Savlov, The Austin Chronicle
 10th – Dennis Dermody, Paper
 Top 10 (listed alphabetically, not ranked) –  Walter Addiego, San Francisco Chronicle

In 2019, The Guardian ranked The Handmaiden 41st in its 100 best films of the 21st century list. In 2020, The Guardian also ranked it number 1 among the classics of modern South Korean Cinema.

Accolades

See also 
 Fingersmith, BBC mini-series that is also based on the book of the same name

References

External links
 

2016 films
2010s erotic drama films
2010s erotic thriller films
2016 LGBT-related films
2010s psychological drama films
2016 psychological thriller films
2016 romantic drama films
2010s romantic thriller films
2016 thriller drama films
2010s Japanese-language films
2010s Korean-language films
South Korean erotic drama films
South Korean erotic thriller films
South Korean erotic romance films
South Korean LGBT-related films
South Korean nonlinear narrative films
South Korean psychological thriller films
South Korean romantic drama films
South Korean romantic thriller films
Juvenile sexuality in films
Lesbian-related films
LGBT-related romantic drama films
LGBT-related thriller films
Films about con artists
Films based on British novels
Films set in the 1930s
Films set in Japan
Films set in Korea under Japanese rule
Films set in South Korea
Films directed by Park Chan-wook
Best Foreign Language Film BAFTA Award winners
CJ Entertainment films
South Korean historical thriller films
Adaptations of works by Welsh writers
2010s South Korean films